Funeral Procession is the name of a painting by Ellis Wilson, which went from obscurity to notoriety in 1986, when it was featured heavily in the episode "The Auction" of TV series The Cosby Show's second season. In the episode, Mrs. Huxtable wins the painting at an auction and pays $11,000 for it. She states that the painting was made by her "great-uncle Ellis". She said it hung in her grandmother's house and it was sold when her grandmother got sick and needed the extra money for medical bills. At the end of the episode, Dr. Huxtable hangs the painting over the family's living room mantle, where it would stay for the remainder of the eight-season series. 

In real life, the painting is displayed as part of the Aaron Douglas Collection at the Amistad Research Center at Tulane University in New Orleans, Louisiana. Ellis Wilson was born on April 20, 1899, in Mayfield, Kentucky, and died on either January 1 or 2, 1977. The most Wilson ever got for one of his paintings was about $300.

References

African-American art
The Cosby Show
Paintings by Ellis Wilson
Funerals
Paintings in Louisiana
Christian processions